Édson Marcelo de Faria Manfron, Tamandaré or simply Marcelo de Faria  (born February 8, 1979, in Curitiba), is a former Brazilian striker. He last played for América-SP.

Club career
He joined the Iranian club Paykan in 2010 and was one of the regular players of the team.

External links
 www.football.fr
 zerozero.pt
 globoesporte
 Guardian Stats Centre
 CBF
 sambafoot

1979 births
Living people
Footballers from Curitiba
Brazilian footballers
Coritiba Foot Ball Club players
Club América footballers
Irapuato F.C. footballers
Expatriate footballers in Iran
Paykan F.C. players
AC Ajaccio players
CR Vasco da Gama players
Associação Portuguesa de Desportos players
San Luis F.C. players
Expatriate footballers in Mexico
Association football goalkeepers
C.F. Os Belenenses players
Brazilian expatriate footballers
Ligue 1 players
Liga MX players
Expatriate footballers in France
Expatriate footballers in Greece